Alexandra "Allie" Rout (born 6 August 1993) is a New Zealand figure skater. She is a six-time New Zealand national champion (2008–2010, 2015–2017).

At her ISU Junior Grand Prix debut in Croatia, she placed 7th with a score of 115.17 points. At the 2008 World Junior Figure Skating Championships in Sofia, Bulgaria, Rout finished 22nd overall. She became the first New Zealand-trained ladies skater to qualify for the free skate at the World Junior Championships.

Programs

Competitive highlights

References

External links
 

Sportspeople from Auckland
New Zealand figure skaters
1993 births
Living people
New Zealand sportswomen
Competitors at the 2015 Winter Universiade